Costus chartaceus, commonly known as the Christmas costus, is a perennial plant with a red inflorescence. It is native to Colombia and Ecuador but cultivated as an ornamental in other regions.

References

External links
Hawaii Botanical Garden, very nice photo of  Costus chartaceus

chartaceus
Flora of Colombia
Flora of Ecuador
Garden plants
Plants described in 1972